Azygophleps simplex is a moth in the family Cossidae found in Nigeria.

References

Moths described in 1905
Azygophleps